Tales of the Alhambra (Spanish: Cuentos de la Alhambra) is a 1950 Spanish comedy film directed by Florián Rey and starring Carmen Sevilla, Aníbal Vela and Manuel Arbó. The film is an adaptation of Washington Irving's 1832 short stories of the same title.

Plot 
American writer Washington Inving travels to La Alhambra de Granada, visiting its moorish buildings and getting inspiration from the people he meets : Mariquilla the gipsy, the soldier in love with her, bandoleers and local politicians.

Cast
In alphabetical order
Manuel Aguilera
Julio F. Alymán
Manuel Arbó as Ventero
Mario Berriatúa as Lucas
Raúl Cancio as Lieutenant
Francisco Cano   
José Guardiola
Manuel Guitián
Casimiro Hurtado as Tío Pichón 
José Isbert as Don Cosme - the scribe
José María Martín
Mari Carmen Obregón
Nicolás D. Perchicot as governor
Santiago Rivero
Rosario Royo as Paquita 
Carmen Sevilla as Mariquilla  
Carmen Sánchez as Doña Tula  
Luis Torrecilla  
Aníbal Vela as Washington Irving
Juan Vázquez as Corregidor  
Roberto Zara as Varguitas

References

External links

1950s historical comedy films
Spanish historical comedy films
Films based on short fiction
Films based on works by Washington Irving
Films directed by Florián Rey
Films scored by Jesús García Leoz
Spanish black-and-white films
1950s Spanish films